Amaury Montfort  (16 January 1915 – 2 December 1999) was a French flying ace of World War II.

Bibliography

1915 births
1999 deaths
French Air and Space Force personnel
French Air Force personnel of World War II
French World War II flying aces